Catalectis is a small genus of the fungus moth family, Tineidae. It is a small and little-studied group, whose precise relationships remain to be discovered. C. pharetropa was once mistaken for a species of Clepticodes, and Oenoe drosoptila of the Meessiinae was also proposed as a species of Catalectis; ít may be that these are all, in fact, closely related.

Only three species are presently contained in this genus:
 Catalectis flexa Bradley, 1957
 Catalectis pharetropa Meyrick, 1920 (= C. clasmatica)
 Catalectis ptilozona Meyrick, 1923

Footnotes

References

  (1986): Pyralidae and Microlepidoptera of the Marquesas Archipelago. Smithsonian Contributions to Zoology 416: 1-485. PDF fulltext (214 MB!)
  [2011]: Global Taxonomic Database of Tineidae (Lepidoptera). Retrieved 2011-DEC-22.

Tineidae
Tineidae genera
Taxa named by Edward Meyrick